The WDS-4 also known as Pappu is a class of diesel-hydraulic locomotive used by Indian Railways for shunting and departmental operations. The model name stands for broad gauge (W), Diesel (D), Shunting  (S) engine. The WDS-4 was once used all over India but most have now been scrapped or condemned from active service.

Locomotive sheds

See also

 Rail transport in India#History
 Locomotives of India
 Rail transport in India

References

https://www.irfca.org/faq/faq-loco2d.html
https://www.irfca.org/faq/faq-specs.html#WDS-6
https://www.irfca.org/apps/locos/list

Bibliography

Diesel-hydraulic locomotives of India
C locomotives
Chittaranjan Locomotive Works locomotives
Railway locomotives introduced in 1967
5 ft 6 in gauge locomotives